UAWC Can refer to:
 Union of Agricultural Work Committees, a Palestinian non-profit supporting farmers.
 Wayne College, is a branch campus of the University of Akron.